General elections were held in Mauritius on 21 August 1983. The result was a victory for an alliance of the Militant Socialist Movement, the Labour Party and the Mauritian Social Democrat Party, which between them won 46 seats. The Militant Socialist Movement (MSM) won 32 seats, whilst the Labour Party secured 9 seats and PMSD five. This alliance allowed Jugnauth to continue as Prime Minister while bringing Seewoosagur Ramgoolam and Gaetan Duval back into the government after their severe defeat in the 1982 elections. Shortly after, Ramgoolam was appointed as Governor General, Duval became Deputy Prime Minister and Satcam Boolell (new leader of the labour Party) became Minister of Foreign Affairs.

The Mauritian Militant Movement (MMM) suffered after the departure of Anerood Jugnauth (who resigned as Leader of the MMM in 1983 to form the MSM) and the Mauritian Socialist Party (the MMM's coalition party since 1982) from the government. The party's leader, Paul Berenger, was not popularly elected in his own constituency. However, under the best loser system, he secured his seat through the representational system. Berenger was afterwards appointed as Leader of the Opposition, a post he held until 1987.

Electoral system
The voting system involved twenty constituencies on Mauritius, which each elected three members. Two seats were elected by residents of Rodrigues, and up to eight seats were filled by the "best losers". Voter turnout was 81.1%.

Results

References

Elections in Mauritius
1983 in Mauritius
Mauritius